The functions of a military attaché are illustrated by the American  military attachés in Japan during the war years.  A series of military officers had been assigned to the American diplomatic mission in Tokyo since 1901 when the US and Japan were co-operating closely in response to the Boxer Rebellion in China. The military attaché advised the United States Ambassador to Japan on military matters, acted as a liaison between US Army and the Imperial General Headquarters, and gathered and disseminated intelligence.  The military attaché's office in Tokyo usually had two assistants and a number of "language officers" who were assigned specifically to learn Japanese whilst attached to Japanese Imperial Army regiments as observers.  These "language officers" translated training and technical manuals and reported on conditions in Japanese military units.

Selected military attachés serving with Entente powers

Russia
 Nakajima Masatake, Japan (1915).
 Mitsumasa Yonai, Japan (1915).
 Vidkun Quisling, Norway (1918).

France
 James Collins, US (1917).

United Kingdom
 Arne Dagfin Dahl, Norway (1916-1919).
 Teijiro Toyoda, Japan (1914).
 Nicholas Alexandrovich Wolkoff, Russia (1913-1919)

United States
 Lieutenant Colonel Karl F. Baldwin, Japan (1917–1919).
 Lieutenant Colonel Halsey E. Yates, Romania (1916-1920).
 Lieutenant Colonel James A. Ruggles, Russia (1918).

Japan
 Kichisaburo Nomura, Japan (1914–1918).
 Major-General Katsusugu Iouye, Japan (1917–1919); awarded Distinguished Service Medal.
 Lieutenant Colonel T. Mizumachi, Japan (1917–1919); awarded Distinguished Service Medal.
 Captain Hsiao Watari, Japan (1917–1919); awarded Distinguished Service Medal.

Belgium
 Arne Dagfin Dahl, Norway (1917-1919).

Selected military attachés serving with Central powers

Germany
 Joseph Ernest Kuhn, US (1915–1916).

Ottoman Empire
Lt. Col. R.H. Williams

See also
 List of participants to Paris Peace Conference, 1919
 Military attachés and observers in the Russo-Japanese War
 United Nations Military Observer

Notes

References

Further reading

 

 World War I
 
World War I-related lists
Lists of journalists